Not all armed forces have policies explicitly permitting LGBT personnel. Generally speaking, Western European militaries show a greater tendency toward inclusion of LGBT individuals. As of January 2021, 21 countries allow transgender military personnel to serve openly: Australia, Austria, Belgium, Bolivia, Brazil, Canada, Chile, Czechia, Denmark, Estonia, Finland, France, Germany, Ireland, Israel, the Netherlands, New Zealand, Norway, Spain, Sweden, and the United Kingdom. Cuba and Thailand reportedly allowed transgender service in a limited capacity. In 1974, the Netherlands was the first country to allow transgender military personnel. The United States has allowed transgender personnel to serve in the military under varying conditions since President Joe Biden signed an executive order that allowed them to do so.

Debate about inclusion of transgender people in the military

Arguments against inclusion 
There are arguments against the inclusion of transgender people in military service. One argument is based on the view that being transgender is a mental illness, and as such transgender individuals are unfit for service. This argument follows a high incidence of depression and suicide manifest in transgender individuals. This is especially pertinent in individuals who have had sex-reassignment surgery and are unsatisfied with the results; in such cases severe depression is prevalent. Hormone therapy can affect mood and a sense of well-being, a factor that counts against inclusion of transgender people and its effect on service capability. Besides the well-being argument of hormone treatment, complications may arise due to hormone treatments. Possible complications arising from estrogen and testosterone therapies include an increased risk of thromboembolic disease, myocardial infarction, breast cancer, fertility problems, stroke, abnormal liver function, renal disease, endometrial cancer, and osteoporosis. Any of these could cause significant issues to effective military service, especially when deployed in remote areas or in field training settings. Another concern is the cost to treat transgender members in the military. A small portion of transgender soldiers seek medical intervention, yearly 30 to 140 pursue hormone treatment and 25 to 100 have surgical reassignment surgery. It is estimated that a male-to-female transition can cost between US$7,000 and $24,000; female-to-male transition can exceed US$50,000. The Defense Department's yearly budget for healthcare is $6 billion, the numbers found in the study show the cost to treat service members with GD would fall between $2.4 million and $8.4 million, that is .04 to .14 percent of the military's annual healthcare budget.

A further argument is that in order to have an effective, smooth-running military, there must be cohesion within the unit. It is argued that transgender individuals would have a negative impact on unit cohesion. "The bonds of trust among individual service members" are vital. There is a fear that if transgender personnel be allowed to serve openly, morale will be detrimentally affected. But this argument neglects to deal with the question of what kinds of structural accommodations might be needed to maintain morale and unit cohesion in such situations. Military service forces members into very intimate living quarters. Requiring members to live in situations that make them feel disconcerted and uncomfortable may result in their performance being undermined.

Arguments for inclusion 
By excluding a demographic from equal service, militaries are overtly intensifying the stigma of that group's civic inferiority. This is supported by the notion that all citizens are obligated to serve their nations if the need arises. Allowing transgender military personnel to serve openly without fear of exclusion would be a huge step toward equality. It has been recognized by some academics that the inclusion of all LGBT personnel in the military is more than a mere human rights issue, it is argued that for militaries to survive in the twenty-first century diversity is critical.

With advancements in the current understanding of human experience, sexual identity is now better understood. Where being transgender was once considered a paraphilic disorder, the current Diagnostic and Statistical Manual of Mental Disorders places being transgender in a separate chapter, terming the condition gender dysphoria. It is argued that militaries that exclude transgender people on grounds of mental illness, whose policies pathologize gender dysphoria, are at odds with the current medical understanding. This argument requires that transgender personnel be treated by the same level of medical care as all other personnel, in accordance with established medical practice.

Experts argue that there is no empirical evidence that supports the argument that transgender people are unfit for service. Often cited are factors such as a supposed predisposition of transgender individuals to problems such as depression, anxiety, and suicidal thoughts; this is countered by the prevalence of these same issues in the LGBT community, yet in many countries their service is not excluded. By creating a more accepting environment, distress that transgender personnel feel might be mitigated if they may serve openly with full support.

Whilst militaries often cite the high medical cost of transgender people, they fail to reconcile this argument with current standards with other service members. For example, militaries often allow hormone treatments for an array of reasons and conditions, besides gender dysphoria; a common hormone treatment being contraceptive. Furthermore, the often cited risks of cross hormone treatment are rare, and not likely to cause any significant issues to the military. Whilst the cost of gender reassignment surgery is high, it is suggested that fewer than 2% of transgender members per year will choose to undergo gender reassignment surgery.

Perhaps one of the most supporting arguments is based on the experiences of the 18 countries that currently allow transgender service. Research on the impacts of allowing LGBT to serve openly in the Israeli Defense Forces, British Armed Forces, and Canadian Armed Forces found no necessary negative impacts on performance, unit cohesion or morality. The idea of unit cohesion can also be demonstrated by a social study conducted less than one year prior to the repeal of the ban preventing transgender personnel from serving openly in the United States military. Morten G. Ender, David E. Rohall, and Michael D. Matthews presented the American military academy, Reserve Officers Training Corps, and civilian undergraduates with a survey to assess the general attitude on the prospect of the transgender community serving in the U.S. Armed Forces. After statistical analysis, 50.8% of individuals disagreed with the ban. In regards to productivity, 72.6% of subjects say that transgender inclusion would have no impact on their ability to do their job. Finally, on the subject of visibility, 21.8% of those interviewed said they would want transgender individuals to tell them their gender preferences, 56.1% said no preference. Overall, based on this study one year prior to the ban, the majority of the people that participated in the survey showed overwhelming support towards the inclusion of the transgender community in the United States military.

In October 2017, ruling that a renewed ban within the US military should not go into force, US District Judge Colleen Kollar-Kotelly stated that the evidence presented up to that time showed that "all of the reasons proffered ... for excluding transgender individuals from the military in this case were not merely unsupported, but were actually contradicted by the studies, conclusions and judgment of the military itself".

Status of transgender people in the military by country

Australia 
Eighteen years after the Australian Defence Force lifted their ban on gay and lesbian service, the ADF reversed policy that excluded transgender people from military service. The policy of inclusion was reportedly still in effect in 2017.

It is believed that the Australian Defence Force was the last agency whose policy specifically allowed for firing employees for transitioning gender. The ADF policy supports diversity in the military identifying LGBTI as a main priority, whose key objective is to position the ADF as an employer of choice, who as an organisation respects and supports the inclusion of gender diverse persons.

In 2013 Australian law formally codified protections against discrimination based on gender identity by including federal protections for LGBTI in the Sex Discrimination Act 1984. There are approximately 15 transgender service member who are openly living as their identified gender, with the support of ADF ranking officials who have been vocally committed to creating an inclusive and diverse military environment.

In a One Plus One interview with ABC News ADF's highest ranking transgender service member Lieutenant Colonel Cate McGregor speechwriter to the Chief of Army, Lieutenant General David Morrison AO, stated that the Chief of Army took the view that the "army could not survive if it became a demographic ghetto" and described an underbelly within the military whose culture was to exclude those who are different. In the wake of the Jedi Council sex scandal Chief of Army released a strongly worded statement urging all service members to show moral courage, to stand against any person degrading another individual. He further stated that he will "be ruthless in ridding the army of people who cannot live up to its values".

Whilst there might still be a long road to full acceptance of the transgender community in Australia, transgender service members and their families are supported by DEFGLIS whose aim is to support LGBTI personnel and families, strengthen defence capability through inclusion, and educate the workforce about diversity.

Austria 
As of 2014, Austria allowed transgender people to serve openly in its military forces. The policy of inclusion was reportedly still in effect in 2017.

Belgium 
As of 2014, Belgium allowed transgender people to serve openly in its military forces. The policy of inclusion was reportedly still in effect in 2017.

Bolivia 
The Armed Forces of Bolivia announced in 2013 that LGBT citizens would be allowed to serve beginning in 2015. As of 2014, Bolivia allowed transgender people to serve openly in the military. The policy of inclusion was reportedly still in effect in 2017.

Brazil 
There is no law forbidding transgender people from serving in the Brazilian Armed Forces. Sexual orientation and gender identity cannot be an obstacle for entry into the police force or the military in Brazil, and some trans women and travestis can be conscripted, like some Brazilian male citizens. According to a survey conducted by the Institute of Applied Economic Research (IPEA) in 2012, 63.7% of Brazilians support the entry of LGBT individuals into the Brazilian Armed Forces, and do not see it as a problem.

Canada 
In 1997, Seargent Sylvia Durand became the first serving member of the Canadian Forces to transition from male to female, and became the first member of any military worldwide to transition openly while serving under the Flag.  On Canada Day of 1998, the military changed her name from Sylvain to Sylvia and changed her sex designation on all of her personal file documents. In 1999, the military paid for her Sex Reassignment Surgery.  Sylvia continued to serve and got promoted to the rank of Warrant Officer.  When she retired in 2012, after more than 31 years of service, she was the assistant to the Canadian Forces Chief Communications Operator.

As of 2014, Canada allowed transgender people to serve openly in its military forces. The policy of inclusion was reportedly still in effect in 2017.

Chile 

Chile allows transgender people to serve openly in its military forces. In 2012, the Law against Discrimination entered into force, which includes sexual orientation, gender identity and gender expression as protected categories. Since then, the Chilean Armed Forces officially repealed all internal regulations that prevented LGBT people from entering the Army, adapting the institution's practices and regulations to current legislation, allowing since then to openly serve gays, lesbians, bisexuals and transgender people.

In 2020, the Chilean Army officially incorporated a transgender man, Benjamín Barrera Silva, into its ranks for the first time.

Czechia 
As of 2014, the Czechia allowed transgender people to serve openly in its military forces. The policy of inclusion was reportedly still in effect in 2017.

Denmark 
As of 2014, Denmark allowed transgender people to serve openly in its military forces. The policy of inclusion was reportedly still in effect in 2017.

Estonia 
As of 2014, Estonia allowed transgender people to serve openly in its military forces. The policy of inclusion was reportedly still in effect in 2017.

Finland 
As of 2014, Finland allowed transgender people to serve openly in its military forces. The policy of inclusion was reportedly still in effect in 2017.

France 
As of 2014, France allowed transgender people to serve openly in its military forces. The policy of inclusion was reportedly still in effect in 2017.

In France, the military is sometimes initially more accepting of transgender service members than civilian authorities are, at least in some localities and jurisdictions, but they are also influenced by rulings of civilian courts which have strict requirements about changing identity documents. One service member was whipsawed by initially positive reception in the military, later overruled after a civilian court decision.

In 2009, a transgender Adjutant in the French Air Force who had already served 18 years as a man, returned to her unit in Nancy as a woman after a sick leave. Her superiors took stock of the situation, and provided the necessary uniforms and military papers with her new name. Delphine Ravisé-Giard was reintegrated into the military smoothly and without incident. On the other hand, she had difficulties in civilian life, such as when presenting her driver's license, passport, or other papers. The military then issued a request to the Nancy  to have her gender and name altered on her birth certificate, but their decision was negative based on the fact that she had not yet undergone sex reassignment surgery so her situation was reversible. A 1992 decision by the Cour de cassation (Court of Appeals) requires those wishing to change their legal documents to show proof of being diagnosed with "transsexual syndrome" which is listed as a long-term psychiatric disorder in France, and to have undergone surgical intervention, but the Adjutant declared that she had no "long-term psychiatric disorder", and any question about any surgical interventions she had or didn't have was her private affair. Her lawyer insinuated that the real reason for the denial had to do with her ability to still have a child, and that the court's objective was sterilization before they would accord a legal name and gender change. The Commissioner for Human Rights of the European Council said that a transgender person "seeking to have their gender identity legally recognized should not be forced to submit to sterilization or to any other medical treatment."

However, in December, following the District Court decision, Hervé Morin, the Minister of Defense, ordered her to turn in her military papers, which she did. Meanwhile, she discovered that the name on her pay stub reverted to her old name, that the military supplement that women service members receive for feminine undergarments had been removed, and that the military was even going to dock her pay for the supplement she received while serving two years as a woman.

Germany 
As of 2014, Germany allowed transgender people to serve openly in its military forces. The policy of inclusion was reportedly still in effect in 2017.

Iran 
As of 2017, Iran requires all male citizens over age 18 to serve in the military except for transgender women, who are classified as having mental disorders. New military identity cards listed the subsection of the law dictating this exemption. This practice of identifying transgender individuals put them at risk of physical abuse and discrimination.

Ireland 
Commenting in July 2017 on the Trump administration's decision to roll back service in the U.S. military by openly transgender personnel, Taoiseach Leo Varadkar said, "On the transgender ban, it is not something I agree with." He further indicated that Ireland had never formally banned transgender military service and that he would not consider introducing such a ban.

Israel 

As of 2014, Israel allowed transgender people to serve openly in its military forces. The policy of inclusion was reportedly still in effect in 2017.

Netherlands 
As of 2014, the Netherlands allowed transgender people to serve openly in its military forces. The policy of inclusion was reportedly still in effect in 2017.

New Zealand 
The New Zealand Defence Force has been lauded as a world leader in diversity and for support of the LGBTQI community, and has been ranked as number one for integration of lesbian, gay, bisexual, and transgender personnel into the nation's military.

With the addition of the Human Rights Act to the New Zealand Bill of Rights Act in 1994, discrimination based on sexual orientation was criminalised. Although there is no specific reference to transgender people in the New Zealand statute, it has been held by the Solicitor General that protections for transgender people did in fact come under the New Zealand Bill of Rights Act 1990 under the sex discrimination provision. Whilst the Human Rights Commission and many activists still assert the need for an express provision in the New Zealand Bill of Rights Act to properly protect transgender people from discrimination, the NZDF as an equal opportunity employer does not discriminate on the basis of gender identity. The policy of inclusion was reportedly still in effect in 2017.

In support of maintaining diversity and inclusiveness the Chief of Defence Force approved the establishment of a support group for the military's LGBTI personnel. In 2012 an organisation called the NZDF Overwatch was launched within the defence force. Overwatch provides peer support and networking within the defence force to the LGBTI community, both in uniform and out. The organisation also offers education and guidance to command and commanders.
The NZDF and Overwatch was recognised for their inclusiveness and approach to equal employment opportunity being named the Supreme award winner of the ANZ and Equal Employment Opportunities Trust, Diversity Awards NZ 2013.

Norway 
As of 2014, Norway allowed transgender people to serve openly in its military forces. The policy of inclusion was reportedly still in effect in 2017.

Spain 
As of 2014, Spain allowed transgender people to serve openly in its military forces. The policy of inclusion was reportedly still in effect in 2017.

Sweden 
As of 2014, Sweden allowed transgender people to serve openly in its military forces. The policy of inclusion was reportedly still in effect in 2017.

Thailand 
In Thailand, identity documents may not be changed. All males must show up for the military conscription event on draft day, and kathoeys are not exempt from this requirement. It is possible for kathoeys to get an exemption certificate that will allow them to avoid service, but they must still attend, in order to present the document and be dismissed. As a result, on draft day, lines of people awaiting processing may include transgender women in makeup and feminine attire, waiting along with the male draftees. Contrary to the wide impression of acceptance of transgender women in Thailand, many complain about being treated as second-class citizens, and of the stress of being undressed or publicly humiliated.

United Kingdom 
As of 2014, the United Kingdom allowed transgender people to serve openly in its military forces. The policy of inclusion was reportedly still in effect in 2017.

United States 

The United States' military policy previously allowed for exclusion of transgender people from service on medical grounds. While cisgender gay, lesbian, and bisexual service members were allowed to serve openly since 2011, transgender service members risked discharge if they did not pass as their assigned sex. This required that service members conceal their gender identities throughout service.

It was estimated that in 2008–2009 there were approximately 15,500 transgender individuals either serving on active duty or in the National Guard or Army Reserve forces within the U.S. Military.

A 2016 study based on previous research estimated that only between 1,320 and 6,630 transgender individuals served on active duty and between 830 and 4,160 in reserve duty, with midrange figures of 2,450 in active duty and 1,510 in reserves. Regardless of how many transgender individuals are members or veterans of the United States Armed Forces, transgender individuals are between 2-5 times more likely to serve in the military than their cisgender (non-trans) counterparts, primarily due to the provision of both financial security and a sense of belonging to a community. These reasons contribute to the belief that the United States Armed Forces is one of the largest, if not the largest, employer of transgender Americans.

A key controversy and concern for transgender service members is the use of military medical services to transition from one gender to another.

Different Administrations policies since 2016 regarding Transgender people and military service has varied, see the summary below.

Barack Obama administration 
On 22 August 2013, the day after her sentencing at an Army court-martial, U.S. soldier Chelsea Manning issued a public statement declaring herself to be a transgender woman. In 2014, while incarcerated in the United States Disciplinary Barracks, Manning filed a lawsuit against Secretary of Defense Hagel for failing to provide appropriate medical treatment necessary for her gender transition. In a military first, hormone therapy to assist with Manning's gender conformity was approved in early 2015 and added to her treatment plan along with other provisions such as cosmetics and female undergarments.

Air Force Secretary Deborah Lee James openly supported a change to the military's transgender policy, stating in 2014 that it was likely to be reviewed in the next year or so. In February 2015, Secretary of Defense Ashton Carter stated he was open minded about including transgender people in the military and that nothing but individual lack of merit should preclude such people from service. Carter's statement was later endorsed by President Obama.

On 19 August 2015, Carter stated in a memo that the Defense Department had begun the process of dismantling the ban and that transgender people would be able to openly serve in the U.S. military by 27 May 2016. Department of Defense regulations that ban transgender persons from US military service were repealed on 30 June 2016. Beginning on that date, otherwise qualified United States service members could not any longer be discharged, denied reenlistment, involuntarily separated, or denied continuation of service because of being transgender.

Donald Trump administration 
On 26 July 2017, US President Donald Trump announced that transgender people would no longer be allowed to serve in the US military. The following day, General Joseph Dunford, Chairman of the Joint Chiefs of Staff, stated that openly transgender people will continue to be allowed to serve until Trump provides direction to James Mattis, the Secretary of Defense.

The Palm Center released, on 1 August 2017, a letter signed by 56 retired generals and admirals opposing the proposed ban on transgender military service members. The letter stated that if implemented, the ban "would cause significant disruptions, deprive the military of mission-critical talent and compromise the integrity of transgender troops who would be forced to live a lie, as well as non-transgender peers who would be forced to choose between reporting their comrades or disobeying policy".

On 9 August 2017, five transgender United States military personnel sued Trump and top Pentagon officials over the proposed banning of transgender people from serving in the military. The suit asks the court to prevent the ban from going into effect. Two major LGBT-rights organizations filed a petition in the United States District Court in Washington on behalf of the five transgender service members.

Trump signed a presidential memorandum, dated 25 August 2017, directing the Secretary of Defense and Secretary of Homeland Security to submit an implementation plan by 21 February 2018, to reinstate the ban and halt the use of military funds for "sex reassignment surgical procedures for military personnel". On 30 October 2017, US District Judge Colleen Kollar-Kotelly barred the administration from excluding transgender people from military service in Jane Doe v. Trump, but did not address whether federal funds should be used to pay for sex reassignment surgery for service members. The ruling also stated that as far as could be seen, "all of the reasons proffered by the president for excluding transgender individuals from the military in this case were not merely unsupported, but were actually contradicted by the studies, conclusions and judgment of the military itself".

In November 2017, the Defense Health Agency for the first time approved payment for sex reassignment surgery for an active-duty US military service member. The patient, an infantry soldier who is a trans woman, had already begun a course of treatment for gender reassignment. The procedure, which the treating doctor deemed medically necessary, was performed on 14 November at a private hospital, since US military hospitals lack the requisite surgical expertise. On 11 December, Kollar-Kotelly ruled that the government must accept transgender recruits into the military by 1 January 2018. After the ruling, the Department of Justice appealed to the United States Court of Appeals for the District of Columbia Circuit to issue a stay on the district court's ruling. The Pentagon confirmed on 26 February 2018 that the first transgender recruit had signed a contract to join the military.

On March 23, 2018, President Trump banned transgender and transsexual people with current or previous gender dysphoria from serving in the U.S. military. However, the Pentagon said they would comply with the court decision until it is reversed. The policy was stayed in Karnoski vs. Trump (Western District of Washington) on 13 April 2018, when the court ruled that the 2018 memorandum essentially repeated the same issues as its predecessor order from 2017, that transgender service members (and transgender individuals as a class) were a protected class entitled to strict scrutiny of adverse laws (or at worst, a quasi-suspect class), and ordered that matter continue to a full trial hearing on the legality of the proposed policy.

On January 22, 2019, the US Supreme Court allowed President Trump's transgender military ban to go into effect while the ban was litigated in lower courts. On March 12, 2019, acting Deputy Defense Secretary David Norquist signed a directive to allow Trump's policy to take effect in 30 days.

Joe Biden administration 
On Biden's first day in office, his press secretary, Jen Psaki, announced in a press conference that the President would soon reverse the government's ban on transgender people from serving openly in the military, though a specific date for this action was not announced. Although Biden had originally said that reversing the ban would be an action taken "on day one", this had been unable to happen due to the fact that his nominee for Secretary of Defense, Lloyd Austin, had still not been confirmed yet.

On January 25, 2021, President Biden signed an executive order to reverse the ban, allowing most transgender individuals to serve in the United States military. The order also required the United States Department of Homeland Security to lift its transgender service ban as well. The order immediately revoked both The Presidential Memorandum of March 23, 2018 (Military Service by Transgender Individuals) and the Presidential Memorandum of August 25, 2017 (Military Service by Transgender Individuals), and also requires the Secretary of Defense and the Secretary of Homeland Security, with respect to the Coast Guard, holds consultation with the Joint Chiefs of Staff to determine how to best implement a full reversal. Biden's order prohibited any service member from being forced out of the military on the basis of gender identity. On April 30, 2021, the Pentagon enacted a new policy which called for better medical service access and gender marker assistance to transgender people in the United States military.

See also 
 Sexual orientation and military service

References

External links 
Palm Center: Blueprints for Sound Public Policy
LGBTInclusion The Hague Centre for Strategic Studies
SPARTA A Transgender Military Advocacy Organization

 
Transgender rights
Human rights